
Gmina Nędza is a rural gmina (administrative district) in Racibórz County, Silesian Voivodeship, in southern Poland.

The gmina contains part of the protected area called Rudy Landscape Park.

Villages
Gmina Nędza contains the villages and settlements of Babice, Ciechowice, Górki Śląskie, Łęg, Nędza, Szymocice and Zawada Książęca.

Neighbouring gminas
Gmina Nędza is bordered by the town of Racibórz and by the gminas of Kuźnia Raciborska, Lyski and Rudnik.

References

Nedza
Racibórz County